Teglio Veneto is a town in the Metropolitan City of Venice, Veneto, Italy. It is south of SP18.

The name derives from that of the Tilia tree, once widespread in the area. The town was mentioned for the first time in an 1187 document.

References

Google Maps